Edward Martin "Eddie" McGoorty (July 31, 1889 – November 2, 1929) was a middleweight American boxer who won the Australian version of the World Middleweight Title during his career.

McGoorty won the amateur 130 lb Boxing Championship of Wisconsin in 1904, at the age of 15. He began boxing professionally in 1905 under the name Edwin Van Dusart. He was briefly recognized as the World Middleweight Champion in Sydney, Australia. His last recorded bout took place in 1922.

McGoorty was the 2016 Inductee for the Australian National Boxing Hall of Fame International category.

References

External links

|-

Only Recognized in Australia

|-

1889 births
1929 deaths
Middleweight boxers
Boxers from Wisconsin
American male boxers